Luxembourg competed at the 2016 Summer Paralympics in Rio de Janeiro, Brazil, from 7 September to 18 September 2016. Tom Habscheid earned the best result for the country with a 7th place in men's shot put F42.

Athletics

Men's Field

Cycling

Road

See also 
Luxembourg at the 2016 Summer Olympics

References 

Nations at the 2016 Summer Paralympics
2016
2016 in Luxembourgian sport